The United Provinces (UP) was a province of India.

History
It came into existence on 1 April 1937 as a result of the shortening of the name of the "United Provinces of British India". It corresponded approximately to the combined regions of the present-day Indian states of Uttar Pradesh and Uttarakhand.

Provincial autonomy
The Government of India Act 1935 enlarged the elected provincial legislature and expanded provincial autonomy vis-a-vis the central government.

In the elections held in 1937, the Indian National Congress won the majority seats, but declined to form a government. Therefore, on 1 April 1937, and the Nawab of Chhatari, the leader of the National Agriculturist Parties, was invited to form a minority provisional government.

The Congress reversed its decision and resolved to accept office in July 1937. Therefore, the Governor Sir Harry Graham Haig invited Govind Ballabh Pant to form the government.

In 1939, all of the Congress ministries in British Indian provinces resigned and the United Provinces were placed under the Governor's rule. In 1945, the  British Labour government ordered new elections to the Provincial legislatures. The Congress won a majority in the 1946 elections in the United Provinces and Pant was again the Premier, continuing even after India's independence in 1947.

Post-independence
Following independence in 1947, the princely states of Rampur, Banares and Tehri-Garwal were merged into the United Provinces. On 25 January 1950, this unit was renamed as Uttar Pradesh. In 2000, the separate state of Uttaranchal, now known as Uttarakhand, was carved out of Uttar Pradesh.

See also
Presidencies and provinces of British India

References

External links
The interesting story on how United Province became Uttar Pradesh at Business Standard

1937 establishments in British India
1950 disestablishments in India
Provinces of British India
Historical Indian regions
British administration in Uttar Pradesh